Isabel Grace Hood Wilson CBE FRCP (6 September 1895 – 8 December 1982) was a Scottish psychiatrist, who was Principal Medical Officer of the Ministry of Health.

Biography 
Isabel Grace Hood Wilson was born on 6 September 1895 in Lasswade, Scotland. Her parents were Susan Charlotte Sandeman and  George Robert Wilson, a physician and psychiatrist. She studied medicine at the University of Edinburgh, graduating in 1921 with an MB ChB, and MD in 1926.

In 1931, Wilson was appointed as a Commissioner of The Board of Control, holding the position until 1948. From 1949 to 1960 she was a Senior Commissioner, after which the Board was abolished and her position was changed to the Principal Medical Officer, Ministry of Health.

She became a Fellow of the Royal College of Physicians in 1947.

Awards and honours
She received a CBE in the 1961 New Year Honours for services as Medical Senior Commissioner at the Board of Control.

References

1895 births
1982 deaths
Commanders of the Order of the British Empire
Fellows of the Royal College of Physicians
British women medical doctors
Place of death missing
Chief Medical Officers for England
British women psychiatrists
Scottish women medical doctors
Alumni of the University of Edinburgh
Scottish psychiatrists